The Oliver Building is a historic building in Billings, Montana. It was built in 1910 as a warehouse for Oliver Chilled Plow Works, a manufacturer of tractors and plows. It was remodelled by architect Chandler C. Cohagen in 1930. It has been listed on the National Register of Historic Places since December 19, 2008.

References

National Register of Historic Places in Yellowstone County, Montana
Chicago school (architecture)
Art Deco architecture in Montana
Commercial buildings completed in 1910
1910 establishments in Montana
Building